Julio García Espinosa (5 September 1926 – 13 April 2016) was a Cuban film director and screenwriter. He directed fourteen films between 1955 and 1998. His 1967 film The Adventures of Juan Quin Quin was entered into the 5th Moscow International Film Festival.

Selected filmography

 El Mégano (1955)
 Sexto Aniversario (1959)
 La Vivienda (1959)
 Cuba baila (1959)
 Patria o Muerte (1959)
 Un año de libertad (1959)
 El joven rebelde (1962)
 The Adventures of Juan Quin Quin (1967)
 Tercer mundo, tercera guerra mundial (1970)
 De Cierta Manera (1974)
 The Other Francisco (1975)
 La sexta parte del mundo (1977)
 Son... o no son (1980)
 La inútil muerte de mi socio Manolo (1989)
 El plano (1993)
 Reina y Rey (1994)

References

External links

1926 births
2016 deaths
People from Havana
Cuban film directors